Picton is a Liverpool City Council Ward within the Liverpool Wavertree Parliamentary constituency. The population at the 2011 census was 17,009. The boundary was altered in 2004 losing some of the pre-2004 ward and gaining from the former Kensington, Smithdown and Arundel wards. It contains the Edge Hill area and parts of Wavertree.

Councillors

post-2004

 indicates seat up for re-election after boundary changes.

 indicates seat up for re-election.

 indicates change in affiliation.

 indicates seat up for re-election after casual vacancy.

Election results

Elections of the 2010s

Elections of the 2000s 

After the boundary change of 2004 the whole of Liverpool City Council faced election. Three Councillors were returned.

• italics - Denotes the sitting Councillor.
• bold - Denotes the winning candidate.

Notes

External links
 Liverpool City Council: Ward profile

References

Wards of Liverpool